Carlos Antonio de Padua Chávez y Ramírez (13 June 1899 – 2 August 1978) was a Mexican composer, conductor, music theorist, educator, journalist, and founder and director of the Mexican Symphonic Orchestra. He was influenced by native Mexican cultures. Of his six symphonies, the second, or Sinfonía india, which uses native Yaqui percussion instruments, is probably the most popular.

Biography

The seventh child of a criollo family, Chávez was born on Tacuba Avenue in Mexico City, near the suburb of Popotla. His paternal grandfather, José María Chávez Alonso, a former governor of the state of Aguascalientes, had been executed by the French Army in April 1864. His father, Augustín Chávez, who died when Carlos was barely three years old, invented a plough that was produced and used in the United States.

Carlos had his first piano lessons from his brother Manuel, and later on he was taught piano by Asunción Parra, Manuel Ponce, and Pedro Luis Ozagón, and harmony by Juan Fuentes. His family often holidayed in Tlaxcala, Michoacán, Guanajuato, Oaxaca, and other places where the cultural influence of the Mexican indigenous peoples was still very strong.

In 1916, Chávez and friends started a cultural journal, Gladios, and this led to his joining the staff of the Mexico City newspaper  in 1924. In the succeeding 36 years he was to write over 500 items for this paper.

After the Mexican Revolution and the installation of a democratically elected president, Álvaro Obregón, Chávez became one of the first exponents of Mexican nationalist music with ballets on Aztec themes.

In September 1922, Chávez married Otilia Ortiz and they went on honeymoon to Europe, from October 1922 until April 1923, spending two weeks in Vienna, five months in Berlin, and eight or ten days in Paris. During the latter visit he met Paul Dukas. Some months later, in December 1923, Chávez visited the United States for the first time, returning in March 1924. Chávez again went to New York City in September 1926 and stayed there until June 1928. Upon his return to Mexico, Chávez became director of the Orquesta Sinfónica Mexicana (Mexican Symphonic Orchestra), later renamed Orquesta Sinfónica de México (Mexico's Symphonic Orchestra); the country's first permanent orchestra, started by a musicians' labor union. Chávez was instrumental in taking the orchestra on tour through Mexico's rural areas.

In December 1928, Chávez was appointed director of Mexico's National Conservatory of Music—a position he held for a total of five years (until March 1933, and again for eight months in 1934). In that capacity, Chávez spearheaded three , two concerned with collecting and cataloguing indigenous music and its literature, and the third to study the uses of old and new scales.

In 1937, Chávez published a book, Toward a New Music, which is one of the first books in which a composer speaks about electronic music. In 1938, he conducted a series of concerts with the NBC Symphony Orchestra, during a period of absence by the orchestra's regular conductor, Arturo Toscanini. In 1940 he produced concerts at New York's Museum of Modern Art, and by 1945, Chávez had come to be regarded as the foremost Mexican composer and conductor.

From January 1947 until 1952, Chávez served as director-general of the National Institute of Fine Arts. In his first year, he formed the National Symphony Orchestra, which supplanted the older OSM as Mexico's premier orchestra and led to the disbanding of the older ensemble. Throughout all this time, Chávez maintained a busy international touring schedule.

In May 1953 he was commissioned by Lincoln Kirstein, director of the New York City center of Music and Drama, for a three-act opera to a libretto by Chester Kallman based on a story by Boccaccio, to be titled The Tuscan Players. The City Center waived its rights to the first performance, which was given under the title Panfilo and Lauretta in the Brander Matthews Theatre at Columbia University in New York on 9 May 1957, under the baton of Howard Shanet. Stage direction was by Bill Butler, scenic design by Herbert Senn and Helen Pond, and costumes by Sylvia Wintle. The principal singers were Sylvia Stahlman, Frank Porretta, Craig Timberlake, Mary McMurray, Michael Kermoyan, and Thomas Stewart.

From 1970 to 1973, Chávez served as the music director of the Cabrillo Festival of Contemporary Music. His orchestral composition Discovery (1969) had previously been commission by the Festival and was first performed there.

Failing health and financial setbacks forced Chávez to sell his house in the Lomas de Chapultepec neighborhood of Mexico City and move in with his daughter Anita in Coyoacán, in the fringes of the Mexican capital, where he died quietly on 2 August 1978.

Chávez's manuscripts and papers are housed in the Music Division of the New York Public Library for the Performing Arts and in the National Archive of Mexico, in Mexico City.

Musical style
Chávez's music does not fall into clear stylistic periods, but rather cumulates elements in a process of continual synthesis. The juvenilia, up to 1921 and consisting primarily of piano compositions, is essentially Romantic, with Robert Schumann as the main influence. A period of nationalistic leanings was initiated in 1921 with the Aztec-themed ballet  (The New Fire), followed by a second ballet,  (The Four Suns), in 1925.

During his time in New York City between 1924 and 1928, Chávez acquired a taste for the then-fashionable abstract and quasi-scientific music, as is reflected in the titles of many of his compositions written between 1923 and 1934:  for piano (Polygons, 1923),  for voice and piano (Hexagons, 1924), 36 for piano (1925),  for nine instruments (Energy, 1925),  for violin and piano (Spiral, 1934), and an unfinished orchestral score titled  (Pyramids).

The culmination of this period was the ballet H. P. (i.e., Horse Power), also known by the Spanish title  (1926–31). H. P. is a colorfully orchestrated score of ample dimensions and dense, compact atmosphere, notable for its dynamism and vitality, revealing the influence of Stravinsky and at the same time returning to folkloric and popular elements, with dances such as the sandunga, tango, huapango, and foxtrot. Diego Rivera designed the sets and costumes for the ballet's premiere in Philadelphia in 1932.

Although this early period saw the creation of the Sonatina for violin and piano (1924), it was only in the 1930s that Chávez returned to another of the main musical interests of his maturity, prefigured in the juvenilia: the traditional genres of the sonata, quartet, symphony, and concerto. He composed six numbered symphonies. The first, titled  (1933), was reworked from incidental music for Jean Cocteau's Antigone, an adaptation of Sophocles' tragedy. In it, Chávez sought to create an archaic ambiance through the use of modal polyphony, harmonies built on fourths and fifths, and a predominant use of wind instruments.

In the fourth of his Norton lectures of 1958–59, titled "Repetition in Music", he described a mode of composition already observable in many of his compositions since the 1920s, in which "The idea of repetition and variation can be replaced by the notion of constant rebirth, of true derivation: a stream that never comes back to its source; a stream in eternal development, like a spiral ..." A notable early example of this method is Soli I (1933), the first work acknowledged by the composer to have been consciously organized according to this principle. It only became a regular feature, however, beginning with Invención I for piano (1958), and subsequently in most of his instrumental compositions of the 1960s and 1970s: Invención II for string trio (1965), Invención III for harp (1967), Soli II for wind quintet (1961), Soli III for bassoon, trumpet, viola, timpani, and orchestra (1969), Soli IV for brass trio (1966), Cinco Caprichos for piano (1975), and the late orchestral works Resonancias (1964), Elatio (1967), Discovery (1969), Clio (1969), and Initium (1970–72).

Recordings

Chávez made more than a handful of recordings, conducting his own music as well as that of other composers. One of the earliest was made in the 1930s for RCA Victor, containing Chávez's Sinfonía de Antígona and Sinfonía india, together with his orchestration of Dieterich Buxtehude's Chaconne in E minor: 4-disc 78-rpm set, Victor Red Seal M 503. The best-known of his discs was the Everest Records stereophonic recording of his Sinfonía india, Sinfonía de Antígona, and Sinfonía romántica, in which Chávez conducted the Stadium Symphony Orchestra, the name given to the New York Philharmonic for its summer performances in the Lewisohn Stadium. The album was originally issued in 1959 by Everest Records on LP SDBR 3029, and was reissued on CD in 1996 by Everest as EVC-9041, as well as at some point by Philips Records. In 1963 Chávez conducted the Vienna State Opera Orchestra in two recordings with pianist Eugene List for Westminster Records, both released on LP: one of his own Concerto for Piano and Orchestra (Westminster WST 17030, reissued in 1976 as Westminster Gold WGS 8324) and one of the two piano concertos by Edward MacDowell (ABC Westminster Gold WGS 8156). 

In the 1950s he released two recordings on US Decca Records, on which he conducted the Orquesta Sinfónica de México. In 1951 a 10-inch mono LP was issued (Decca Gold Label DL 7512, reissued 1978 by Varèse Sarabande on side 2 of 12-inch LP ), containing his Suite from La hija de Cólquide (originally recorded in 1947 for the Mexican label Anfión and issued as a 3-disc 78 rpm set Anfión AM 4), and in 1956 Decca released an anthology, Music of Mexico, on which he conducted three of his own works, plus José Pablo Moncayo's Huapango (Decca Gold Label LP, DL9527). 

He also made some recordings for Columbia Records which were issued on 78-rpm discs and on LP (Columbia 4-disc 78-rpm set M 414, reissued 1949 on Columbia 10-inch LP, Columbia ML 2080 and Mexican Columbia DCL 98, reissued on Columbia 12-inch LP, LL 1015; CBS Masterworks 3-LP set 32 31 0001 (mono)/ 32 31 002 (stereo); CBC Masterworks LP 32 11 0064; Columbia LP M32685; Odyssey LP Y 31534). In 1961 he recorded Sergei Prokofiev's Peter and the Wolf, with the Orquesta Sinfónica de México and Carlos Pellicer, narrator, released on Mexican Columbia MC 1360.

List of works

See also
 Grupo de los cuatro, formed in 1935: Daniel Ayala Pérez, Salvador Contreras, Blas Galindo, and José Pablo Moncayo; all influenced by Chávez

References

Sources

Further reading
 Chávez, Carlos. 1937. Toward a New Music: Music and Electricity, translated from the Spanish by Herbert Weinstock, with eight illustrations by Antonio Ruíz. New York: W. W. Norton. Reprinted, New York: Da Capo Press, 1975. . First Spanish edition, as Hacia una nueva música: ensayo sobre música y electricidad. México: El Colegio Nacional, 1992. .
 Chávez, Carlos. 1997– . Obras, compiled and edited by Gloria Carmona. México: El Colegio Nacional.  (set);  (vol. 1: "Escritos periodísticos (1916–1939)").
 Miranda, Ricardo, and Yael Bitrán (eds.). 2002. Diálogo de resplandores: Carlos Chávez y Silvestre Revueltas. México, D.F.: Consejo Nacional para la Cultura y las Artes (CONACULTA). .
 Saavedra, Leonora (ed.). 2015. Carlos Chávez and His World. Princeton: Princeton University Press, 2015.  (cloth); .

External links

 
 
 Carlos Chávez manuscripts in the Music Division of the New York Public Library for the Performing Arts

1899 births
1978 deaths
Musicians from Mexico City
Writers from Mexico City
Members of El Colegio Nacional (Mexico)
20th-century classical composers
Harvard University faculty
Mexican conductors (music)
Male conductors (music)
Mexican male classical composers
Mexican classical composers
National Conservatory of Music of Mexico alumni
Academic staff of the National Conservatory of Music of Mexico
20th-century conductors (music)
20th-century male musicians